Nikolai Chuzhikov (sometimes listed as Nikoly Zhushikov or Nikolay Zhuzhikov, born 5 May 1938) is a Soviet sprint canoeist who competed in the 1960s. Competing in two Summer Olympics, he won a gold in the K-4 1000 m at Tokyo in 1964.

Chuzhikov also won two medals at the ICF Canoe Sprint World Championships with a gold (K-4 10000 m: 1966) and a bronze (K-2 1000 m: 1963).

References

External links

1938 births
Canoeists at the 1964 Summer Olympics
Canoeists at the 1968 Summer Olympics
Living people
People from Belgorod Oblast
Olympic canoeists of the Soviet Union
Olympic gold medalists for the Soviet Union
Soviet male canoeists
Olympic medalists in canoeing
Russian male canoeists
ICF Canoe Sprint World Championships medalists in kayak
Medalists at the 1964 Summer Olympics
Sportspeople from Belgorod Oblast